James W. Thomas or Jim Thomas is an American business executive who held key positions at Rivian Automotive and MapQuest. He is known for managing the initial public offering of MapQuest.

Early life
Thomas graduated from Florida Institute of Technology with a bachelor's degree in mathematics in 1972 and received a Master of Business Administration from the University of Virginia Darden School of Business.

Career
In 1995, he assisted with the startup of MapQuest. He became the Chief Operating Officer and Chief Financial Officer, and helped MapQuest become a leading internet mapping company. In 1999, he managed the initial public offering of MapQuest on the Nasdaq and sale to AOL, which was completed in 2000.

In 2010, he joined Avera Motors shortly after foundation and became the Executive Vice President and Chief Financial Officer. Avera Motors became Rivian, and he became the Vice President of Corporate Development.

In 2011, he was the recipient of the Lifetime Achievement in Technology award by Florida Congressman Bill Posey. In 2017, he was the recipient of the Florida Institute of Technology distinguished alumni award. In 2019, he was inducted into the Florida Institute of Technology Career Hall of Fame.

References

1959 births
Living people
American chief operating officers
Florida Institute of Technology alumni
University of Virginia Darden School of Business alumni